is a railway station on the Osaka Metro Midosuji Line in Yodogawa-ku, Osaka, Japan. It also serves as an interchange for Minamikata Station on the Hankyu Railway Kyoto Line.

Connecting line from Nishinakajima-Minamigata
Hankyu Kyoto Line (Minamikata Station)

Station layout
The station has two elevated side platforms.

External links

Railway stations in Osaka Prefecture
Railway stations in Japan opened in 1964
Osaka Metro stations